Isohydnocera is a genus of checkered beetles in the family Cleridae. There are about 14 described species in Isohydnocera.

Species
 Isohydnocera aegra (Newman, 1840)
 Isohydnocera albocincta (Horn, 1871)
 Isohydnocera brunnea Chapin, 1917
 Isohydnocera chiricahuana Knull, 1949
 Isohydnocera curtipennis (Newman, 1840)
 Isohydnocera gerhardi (Wolcott, 1910)
 Isohydnocera liebecki Wolcott, 1928
 Isohydnocera mima Wolcott, 1928
 Isohydnocera nigrina (Schaeffer, 1908)
 Isohydnocera ornata (Wolcott, 1908)
 Isohydnocera pusilla (Schaeffer, 1909)
 Isohydnocera schusteri (LeConte, 1866)
 Isohydnocera tabida (Leconte, 1849)
 Isohydnocera tricondylae (LeConte, 1849)

References

 Corporaal, J. B. / Hincks, W. D., ed. (1950). Coleopterorum Catalogus Supplementa, Pars 23: (Editio Secunda) Cleridae, 373.
 Opitz, Weston / Arnett, Ross H. Jr., Michael C. Thomas, Paul E. Skelley, and J. Howard Frank, eds. (2002). "Family 73. Cleridae Latreille 1804". American Beetles, vol. 2: Polyphaga: Scarabaeoidea through Curculionoidea, 267–280.

Further reading

 NCBI Taxonomy Browser, Isohydnocera
 Arnett, R. H. Jr., M. C. Thomas, P. E. Skelley and J. H. Frank. (eds.). (21 June 2002). American Beetles, Volume II: Polyphaga: Scarabaeoidea through Curculionoidea. CRC Press LLC, Boca Raton, Florida .
 Arnett, Ross H. (2000). American Insects: A Handbook of the Insects of America North of Mexico. CRC Press.
 Richard E. White. (1983). Peterson Field Guides: Beetles. Houghton Mifflin Company.

Cleridae